Kahiri (also Romanized as Kahīrī; also known as Kāhīr and Koch Gowrow) is a village in Bahu Kalat Rural District, Dashtiari District, Chabahar County, Sistan and Baluchestan Province, Iran. At the 2006 census, its population was 278, in 50 families.

References 

Populated places in Dashtiari County